Justin Melvey (born 7 May 1969) is an Australian actor who has appeared in a number of television series in Australia and the US.

Career
Melvey is best known to Australian audiences for his role as Harry Reynolds in the evening soap opera Home and Away from 1999 to 2001. This earned him a Logie Award for Most Popular New Talent on Australian television.

Melvey is best known to United States television audiences for his work on the soap opera Days of Our Lives. He played Dr. Colin Murphy from October 2001 to January 2003. Australian viewers did not get to see this stint, as the Nine Network decided in late 2004 to skip 864 episodes of Days in order to catch up with the US (instead airing a special, "A New Day", to show highlights of the four years of storyline thus skipped). However, Melvey returned to Days for a short stint in late 2004, which Australian viewers were able to see. He also appeared for a brief stint as Andrew Olsen on General Hospital in 2005.

In 2005, Melvey appeared on the Australian version of Dancing with the Stars. In 2006, he was a contestant on Australia's Celebrity Survivor, coming second.

In 2009, he portrayed the Clue Master on the Australian version of The Phone.

Melvey attended Waverley College and graduated in 1986.

Television filmography
 Chasing Comets (2018)
 Prescriptions TV Series as Judd (2006)
 Life on Mars (V) as Dustin/John Ronson/Doctor Cloud (2006)
 Death of a Saleswoman as Geyer O'Brian (2005)
 General Hospital as Andrew Olsen (2005)
 Faultline (TV) as Frank Martell (2004)
 Days of Our Lives as Dr. Colin Murphy (#2) (2001–2003, 2004)
 Home and Away as Harry Keller Reynolds (1999–2001)

References

External links
 

1969 births
Australian male television actors
Living people
Logie Award winners
Male actors from Sydney
Australian Survivor contestants